The AeroVironment Switchblade is a miniature loitering munition, designed by AeroVironment and used by several branches of the United States military. Small enough to fit in a backpack, the Switchblade launches from a tube, flies to the target area, and crashes into its target while detonating its explosive warhead. The name switchblade comes from the way the spring-loaded wings are folded up inside a tube and flip out once released.

Introduced in 2011, the original Switchblade was rebranded the Switchblade300 after the much larger and very different Switchblade600 anti-armor variant was unveiled in 2020. The Blackwing, an unarmed variant of the Switchblade300 was released in 2015. More than 700 Switchblade 300 drones were sent to Ukraine by the United States as part of an arms package after the 2022 Russian invasion of Ukraine.

History
Conceived by the U.S. Air Force Special Operations Command (AFSOC), developed by the U.S. Army, the Switchblade was meant to help U.S. troops respond to enemy ambushes in Afghanistan. Close air support takes time to arrive, is expensive to conduct, and risks collateral damage in urban areas. Troop-carried guided missiles such as the FGM-148 Javelin are also much larger, heavier, and more expensive, and few if any are carried on a typical patrol. 

Human-portable unmanned aerial vehicles (UAVs) like the Raven or Puma can spot threats but lack weapons. The backpackable, relatively inexpensive Switchblade has sensors to help spot enemy fighters and an explosive warhead to attack them from above, which is especially helpful in dug-in positions like rooftops or ridge lines. 

On 29 July 2011, the U.S. Army awarded AeroVironment a $4.9 million contract for "rapid fielding" of an unspecified number of Switchblades to forces in Afghanistan. On 20 March 2012, the Army added $5.1 million, totaling $10 million.

In May 2012, the United States Marine Corps began ordering Switchblades to allow troops to strike improvised explosive device (IED) emplacement teams and similar targets. Usually when air support is called in, attackers slip away before a large UAV, attack helicopter, fighter-bomber, or quick reaction force can arrive on station. Marines sometimes couldn't get support due to other units getting mission priority. The Switchblade is small enough to fit in a Marine's ALICE or MOLLE pack and locks onto and tracks a target once selected.

In late 2012, 75 Switchblades were supplied to U.S. soldiers in Afghanistan. Several successful employments had occurred by January 2013. Although the military would not confirm details about its deployment, effectiveness, distribution, or tactical employment, commanders reported that it was "very effective". Shortly after, a joint urgent needs statement was requested by the Army theater commanders for more systems. The number requested was not specified, but was "dramatically more" than the 75 systems initially supplied and exceeded budget limitations. The Switchblade gained notoriety among soldiers using it and insurgents targeted by it. The Army classifies it as a direct fire munition rather than a drone. 

Soldiers embraced it as a valuable tool, especially to reduce collateral damage. Unlike most other weapons, the Switchblade can wave off or abort a mission if the situation changes after launch, allowing it to engage a secondary target or destroy itself without inflicting casualties or property damage. Wave off was used over a dozen times to prevent civilian casualties that could have been caused had a person not been in the decision loop.

On 28 August 2013, AeroVironment announced it had been awarded five contracts totaling $15.8 million to supply more Switchblade systems, ancillary equipment, and support to the Army. One week later, the Pentagon gave the company a follow-on contract worth $6.6 million. On 5 September 2013, AeroVironment was awarded a $29 million contract modification to supply Switchblade munitions systems and associated hardware and support services, totaling $51.4 million worth in contracts announced over nine days.

In April 2015, the Marines test-fired a Switchblade out of the back of an MV-22 Osprey. The drone was not equipped with a warhead, but was successfully released and accurately steered toward a target. The test showed that the Switchblade could be air-launched from the aircraft and add a remotely controlled, weaponized surveillance tool to the Osprey. From its introduction to the end of Operation Enduring Freedom, over 4,000 Switchblades were deployed in Afghanistan. In mid-2017, 350 Switchblades were delivered to SOCOM for use against Islamic State.

On 28 April 2016, AeroVironment announced they had developed an upgrade for the Switchblade Tactical Missile system designated Block 10C. In October 2016, AeroVironment announced the Multi-Pack Launcher (MPL), a system to carry and remotely launch several Switchblades. 

In October 2020, AeroVironment announced a project with Kratos Defense & Security Solutions to demonstrate a "high-speed, long-range unmanned combat air vehicle" that serves as a mothership to deliver Switchblade 300s in large numbers that cooperatively attack and overwhelm enemy defenses.

In late 2018, AeroVironment was working on the larger Switchblade 600. In March 2020, AeroVironment revealed it had flight tested the product the previous year. In October 2020, AeroVironment unveiled the larger unit. By the time of its unveiling it had undergone 60 test flights from ground launches against fixed and moving targets.

On 31 March 2021, AeroVironment was awarded a USD26.1 million contract by SOCOM for the Switchblade 600. The system addresses the United States Naval Special Warfare Command's Maritime Precision Engagement (MPE) requirement to engage asymmetric threats with Combatant Craft Medium (CCM) and Heavy (CCH) boats acting as host platforms.

In March 2022, it was reported that the US was considering providing Switchblade drones to the Ukrainian armed forces following the 2022 Russian invasion of Ukraine. On 16 March, the White House announced that "100 Tactical Unmanned Aerial Systems" would be provided to Ukraine as part of a $800 million military aid package. Another 600 systems were announced to be sent in April, bringing the total number of munitions sent to Ukraine to 700.

Ukraine first reported using a Switchblade on a Russian target in Kharkiv Oblast in early May. A Switchblade 300 was used against a bunker; it is unclear if it was shot down or completed its task by exploding. Russian forces recovered the remains. Despite receiving hundreds of Switchblade drones, some Ukrainian units prefer to use commercial drones equipped with explosives that are easier to use. The U.S. planned to also send the anti-armor Switchblade 600, but although the Switchblade 300 was delivered soon after being pledged to Ukraine, the larger Switchblade 600 was not because it was still a prototype and not considered a fielded capability, so it had to complete testing and evaluation. While the Switchblade 300 has been used against soft Russian targets like fuel trucks, personnel carriers, machine gun nests, trench positions and dismounted infantry, the Switchblade 600 can be used against heavy armor including tanks. In October 2022, AeroVironment said the first batch of 10 Switchblade 600s would likely be in Ukraine "in the next few weeks."

Design

Switchblade 300

The Switchblade 300 is designed as an expendable UAV to increase precision firepower for platoon-sized infantry units.

Its small size limits its endurance to 10 minutes. This makes it unsuited for scouting roles, but it is useful for inexpensively engaging long-range targets and assisting in relieving units pinned down by enemy fire. The Switchblade uses a color camera and GPS locating to identify, track, and engage targets, as well as being able to be pre-programmed on a collision course. Its warhead has an explosive charge equivalent to a 40mm grenade to destroy light armored vehicles and personnel. If a situation causes a strike to be called off, the operator can call off the Switchblade and re-target it.

The Switchblade uses the same Ground Control Station (GCS) as other AeroVironment UAVs including the Wasp, RQ-11 Raven, and RQ-20 Puma. This creates commonality and the potential for teaming of longer-endurance small UAVs to recon for targets, then having the Switchblade attack once they are identified with the same controller.

U.S. Army regulations categorize the Switchblade as a missile rather than a drone. The term "loitering munition" is preferred to describe it. Unlike UAVs, it is not recoverable once launched. Its operation is similar to that of the wireless TOW missile, through a fly-by-radio frequency signal. The only difference being the TOW doesn't loiter, but both have the same operator-in-the-loop characteristics. The Switchblade uses daytime and infrared cameras, as well as an "aided target tracker" to lock on to stationary and moving targets.

The warhead is specifically designed for controlled firepower to reduce collateral damage through a focused blast. It has a forward-firing shotgun-blast effect rather than a 360-degree blast, throwing pellets in the direction that the missile is traveling. It can be fused to detonate at a predetermined height, which can be adjusted in-flight. When diving, the air vehicle gives the operator the opportunity to wave off until four seconds from impact. The warhead can be detonated in-flight to destroy it.

The Switchblade does not fit into established doctrines, since it is not an armed reconnaissance vehicle dispatched by a platoon commander to scout over an area and destroy enemies, or an intelligence, surveillance and reconnaissance (ISR) platform, as its cameras are for seeing targets instead of performing recon. It meets the need for small squads and platoons that lack high-level intelligence and communications to have the ability to fire missiles beyond ranges they are trying to influence.

Aside from use against ground targets, SRC Inc. has developed software to combine the Switchblade with sensors to be able to intercept hostile UAVs. The Switchblade is used alongside an existing counter-artillery radar and IED jamming system, all of which can be towed by Humvees. Interception of an enemy drone occurs in layers of defenses: if a drone gets through covering jet fighters or is too small to be targeted by them, it is picked up by the fire-finding radar. Once detected, the jammer performs electronic warfare to break its data-link. If the drone resists EW, the Switchblade is launched to physically impact and destroy it.

Block 10C incorporates a Digital Data Link (DDL) to provide a stable and secure encrypted communication link through more efficient use of existing frequency bands and significantly reduced likelihood of signal interception, as well as enables concurrent operation of multiple Switchblade systems in the same vicinity without signal conflict, gives opportunity to extend operational ranges using another DDL arbiter such as a different AeroVironment UAV, and facilitates sensor to shooter operations through automatic communication of mission plans from one AeroVironment UAS to a Switchblade. 

The Multi-Pack Launcher (MPL) remotely launches multiple Switchblades. The MPL comes in a standard 6-pack configuration weighing  fully loaded. The design is scalable from 2 to 20 rounds and enables rapid reloading of less than 30 seconds per round. The U.S. Army began deploying the MPL in early 2019 for base defense.

Switchblade 600
The larger Switchblade 600 loitering munition weighs  including the all-up round in the tube and FCS; the airframe weighs , with the FCS consisting of a tablet and long-range antenna. The system is man-portable and can be set up in 10 minutes. It attacks at a  dash speed, carrying an ATGM warhead based on the Javelin ATGM, designed to neutralize armored vehicles.

A touchscreen tablet-based fire control system can manually or autonomously control the munition. It is secured through onboard encrypted data links and Selective Availability Anti-Spoofing Module GPS with a patented wave-off capability. An optional pocket digital data link (DDL) module allows engagements beyond . The larger Switchblade could be fitted with an anti-tank warhead while having longer range and costing less than anti-tank missiles like the FGM-148 Javelin.

The Switchblade 600 was developed for the Army Single Multi-Mission Attack Missile development program. Other methods could include a six-pack vehicle-mounted version and by air-launch.

In October 2022, AeroVironment said it was capable of producing more than 2,000 Switchblade 600 systems annually, and that it planned within a few months to increase production capacity to 6,000 per year.

Blackwing
First demonstrated in 2015, the AeroVironment Blackwing is an unarmed variant of the Switchblade300 with similar weight and dimensions.  It was developed for the United States Navy to provide rapid ISR (Intelligence, surveillance and reconnaissance) as well as command and control relay operations among surface and undersea manned and unmanned vessels. The Blackwing can be deployed from a submerged submarine, surface ship, or mobile ground launcher.

Current operators

British Armed Forces
 
U.S. Armed Forces
 
Ukrainian Armed Forces

Future operators

Lithuanian Armed Forces: In December 2022, Lithuania signed a contract to acquire Switchblade 600 loitering munitions.

See also
 Raytheon Coyote
 Phoenix Ghost, a similar drone
 UVision HERO-30
 Pike (munition)
 ZALA Lancet

References

External link
 Switchblade 300 AeroVironment website
 Switchblade 600 AeroVironment website

Unmanned aerial vehicles of the United States
Loitering munition
Military vehicles introduced in the 2010s